Augusta Bay is a bay of the Ellesmere Island, Nunavut, Canada, located at coordinates
. Meltwater from the Prince of Wales Icefield channels into the bay with its mouth opening into the Bay Fiord.

References

Bays of Qikiqtaaluk Region